The Romani (also spelled Romany or Rromani), colloquially known as the Roma, are an Indo-Aryan ethnic group and traditionally nomadic itinerants. They live in Europe and Anatolia, and have diaspora populations located worldwide with significant concentrations in the Americas.

In the English language the Romani people are widely known by the exonym Gypsies (or Gipsies), which is considered pejorative by some Romani people due to its connotations of illegality and irregularity as well as its historical use as a racial slur. For versions (some of which are cognates) of the word in many other languages (e.g.,  and ) this perception is either very small or non-existent. At the first World Romani Congress in 1971, its attendees unanimously voted to reject the use of all exonyms for the Romani people, including Gypsy, due to their aforementioned negative and stereotypical connotations.

Linguistic and genetic evidence suggests that the Roma originated in the Indian subcontinent; in particular, the region of Rajasthan. They are dispersed, but their most concentrated populations are located in Europe, especially Central, Eastern and Southern Europe, Southern France, as well as Western Asia (mainly Turkey). The Romani people arrived in West Asia and Europe around the 14th century.

Since the 19th century, some Romani people have also migrated to the Americas. There are an estimated one million Roma in the United States and 800,000 in Brazil, most of whose ancestors emigrated in the 19th century from Eastern Europe. Brazil also includes a notable Romani community descended from people deported by the Portuguese Empire during the Portuguese Inquisition. In migrations since the late 19th century, Romani people have also moved to other countries in South America and to Canada. Though often confused with them, the Romani people are culturally different from Irish Travellers and the Yenish people, two groups who may be related to each other.

Romani is an Indo-Aryan language with strong Balkan and Greek influence. It is divided into several dialects, which together are estimated to have more than two million speakers. Because it has traditionally been an oral language, many Romani people are native speakers of the dominant language in their country of residence or of mixed languages combining the dominant language with a dialect of Romani; those varieties are sometimes called Para-Romani.

The Romani began to leave India about 1,000 years ago. They most likely left to escape the invasion of Afghan general Mahmud of Ghazni early in the 11th century. Mahmud's troops probably pushed the Romani out of northern India and into the area that is now Pakistan, Afghanistan, and Iran.

Population and subgroups

Romani population 

For a variety of reasons many Romanis choose not to register their ethnic identity in official censuses. There are an estimated 10 million Romani people in Europe (as of 2019), although some Romani organizations give estimates as high as 14 million. Significant Romani populations are found in the Balkans, in some Central European states, in Spain, France, Russia and Ukraine. In the European Union, there are an estimated 6 million Romanis. Several million more Romanis may live outside Europe, in particular in the Middle East and in the Americas.

Romani homeland
There is no single Romani "homeland". A home country for the Romani people has been proposed, under the name Romanistan.

Romani subgroups 

Like the Roma in general, many different ethnonyms are given to subgroups of Roma. Sometimes a subgroup uses more than one endonym, is commonly known by an exonym or erroneously by the endonym of another subgroup. The only name approaching an all-encompassing self-description is Rom. Even when subgroups do not use the name, they all acknowledge a common origin and a dichotomy between themselves and Gadjo (non-Roma). For instance, while the main group of Roma in German-speaking countries refer to themselves as Sinti, their name for their original language is Romanes.

Subgroups have been described as, in part, a result of the castes and subcastes in India, which the founding population of Rom almost certainly experienced in their South Asian urheimat.

Many groups use names apparently derived from the Romani word kalo or calo, meaning "black" or "absorbing all light". This closely resembles words for "black" or "dark" in Indo-Aryan languages (e.g. Sanskrit काल kāla: "black", "of a dark colour"). Likewise, the name of the Dom or Domba people of North India–to whom the Roma have genetic, cultural and linguistic links–has come to imply "dark-skinned", in some Indian languages. Hence names such as kale and calé may have originated as an exonym or a euphemism for Roma.

Other endonyms for Romani include, for example:
 Ashkali  – Albanian-speaking Muslim Roma communities in the Balkans
 Arlije (also Erlides, Yerli meaning local, from the Turkish word Yerli) in Balkans and Turkey to describe sedentary Muslim roma.
 Bashaldé – Hungarian-Slovak Roma diaspora in the US from the late 19th century.
 Çerge also Čergarja (Nomad), Nomadic Lifestyle Muslim Roma at Balkans and Turkey.
 Calé is the endonym used by both the Spanish Roma (gitanos) and Portuguese Roma ciganos; Caló is "the language spoken by the calé".
 Dasikane or Daskane, meaning slaves or servants, a Religionym and confessionym for Orthodox Christian Roma in the Balkans.
 Kaale, in Finland and Sweden.
 Garachi Shia Islam followers Roma people in Azerbaijan
 Gurbeti Muslim Roma in Northern Cyprus, Turkey and Balkans.
 Kale, Kalá, or Valshanange – Welsh English endonym used by some Roma clans in Wales. (Romanichal also live in Wales.) Romani in Spain are also attributed to the Kale.
 Horahane or Xoraxai, also known as "Turkish Roma", Muslim Roma, a Religionym and confessionym in the Balkans for Muslim Romani people. 
 Lalleri, from Austria, Germany, and the western Czech Republic (including the former Sudetenland).
 Lovari, from Hungary, known in Serbia as Machvaya, Machavaya, Machwaya, or Macwaia. 
 Lyuli, in Central Asian countries.
 Romanlar in Turkey, Turkish speaking Muslim roma in Turkey, also called Çingene or Şopar, with all subgroups, who named after their professions, like:
 Cambazı (Acrobatics and horse trading)
 Sünnetçi (Circumciser), like a Mohel
 Kuyumcu (Goldsmith)
 Subaşı (Water carrier)
 Çiçekçi (Flower seller)
 Sepetçi (Basketmaker) 
 Ayıcı (Bear-leader) 
 Kalaycı (Tinsmith) 
 Müzisyen (Musician)
 Şarkıcı (Singer)
 Demirci (Blacksmith) etc., but the majority of Turkish Roma work as day laborers too.
 Rom in Italy.
 Roma in Romania, commonly known by majority ethnic Romanians as Țigani, including many subgroups defined by occupation:
 Boyash, also known as Băieși, Lingurari, Ludar, Ludari, or Rudari, who coalesced in the Apuseni Mountains of Transylvania. Băieși is a Romanian word for "miners". Lingurari means "spoon makers", Ludar, Ludari, and Rudari may mean "woodworkers" or "miners". (There is a semantic overlap due to the homophony or merging of lemmas with different meanings from at least two languages: the Serbian rudar miner, and ruda stick, staff, rod, bar, pole (in Hungarian rúd, and in Romanian rudă).)
 Churari, from Romanian Ciurari, "sieve makers", Zlătari "gold smiths"
 Ursari (bear trainers, from Moldovan/Romanian urs "bear"),
 Ungaritza blacksmiths and bladesmiths
 Argintari silversmiths.
 Aurari goldsmiths.
 Florari flower sellers.
 Lăutari singers.
 Kalderash, from Romanian căldărar, lit. bucketmaker, meaning kettlemaker, tinsmith, tinker; also in Moldova and Ukraine.
 Roma or Romové, Czech Republic
 Roma or Rómovia, Slovakia
 Romanichal, in the United Kingdom, emigrated also to the United States, Canada and Australia
 Romanisæl, in Norway and Sweden.
 Roms or Manouche (from manush "people" in Romani) in France.
 Romungro or Carpathian Romani from eastern Hungary and neighbouring parts of the Carpathians
 Sinti or Zinti, predominantly in Germany, and Northern Italy; Sinti do not refer to themselves as Roma, although their language is called Romanes.
 Zargari people, Shia Muslim Roma in Iran, who once came from Rumelia/Southern Bulgaria from the Maritsa Valley in Ottoman Time and settled in Persia.

Diaspora 

The Roma people have a number of distinct populations, the largest being the Roma who reached Anatolia and the Balkans about the early 12th century from a migration out of northwestern India beginning about 600 years earlier. They settled in the areas that are now Turkey, Greece, Serbia, Romania, Moldova, Bulgaria, North Macedonia, Hungary, Slovakia and Spain, by order of volume. From the Balkans, they migrated throughout Europe and Iberian Calé or Caló, and, in the nineteenth and later centuries, to the Americas. The Romani population in the United States is estimated at more than one million. Brazil has the second largest Romani population in the Americas, estimated at 800,000 by the 2011 census.

The Romani people are mainly called ciganos by non-Romani ethnic Brazilians. Most of them belong to the ethnic subgroup Calés (Kale), of the Iberian peninsula. Juscelino Kubitschek, Brazilian president during 1956–1961 term, was 50% Czech Romani by his mother's bloodline, and Washington Luís, last president of the First Brazilian Republic (1926–1930 term), had Portuguese Kale ancestry.

Unfortunately, the persecution against the Romani people has led to the fact that many of the cultural practices have been extinguished, hidden or modified in order to survive in a country that has excluded them ethnically and culturally.

The very common Carnivals throughout the entire Brazilian territory are one of the few spaces in which the Romani people can still express their cultural traditions, being a moment in which they can practice their dances and rituals. Traditions include the so-called "carnival wedding" in which a child of the male sex is disguised as a bride or the famous "Romaní Dance" which is picturesquely simulated with the women of the town parading in their traditional attire.

There is no official or reliable count of the Romani populations worldwide. Many Romani refuse to register their ethnic identity in official censuses for fear of discrimination. Others are descendants of intermarriage with local populations, some who no longer identify only as Romani and some who don't identify as Romani at all.

As of the early 2000s, an estimated 3.8 to 9 million Romani people lived in Europe and Asia Minor, although some Romani organizations estimate numbers as high as 14 million. Significant Romani populations are found in the Balkan peninsula, in some Central European states, in Spain, France, Russia, and Ukraine. The total number of Romani living outside Europe are primarily in the Middle East and North Africa and in the Americas and are estimated in total at more than two million. Some countries do not collect data by ethnicity.

The Romani people identify as distinct ethnicities based in part on territorial, cultural and dialectal differences, and self-designation.

Origin 

Genetic findings suggest an Indian origin for Roma. Because Romani groups did not keep chronicles of their history or have oral accounts of it, most hypotheses about the Romani migration's early history are based on linguistic theory. There is also no known record of a migration from India to Europe from medieval times that can be connected indisputably to Roma.

Shahnameh legend 
According to a legend reported in the Persian epic poem, the Shahnameh, from Iran and repeated by several modern authors, the Sasanian king Bahrām V Gōr learned towards the end of his reign (421–439) that the poor could not afford to enjoy music, and he asked the king of India to send him ten thousand luris, lute-playing experts. When the luris arrived, Bahrām gave each one an ox, a donkey, and a donkey-load of wheat so that they could live on agriculture and play music for free for the poor. However, the luris ate the oxen and the wheat and came back a year later with their cheeks hollowed with hunger. The king, angered with their having wasted what he had given them, ordered them to pack up their bags and go wandering around the world on their donkeys.

Linguistic evidence 
The linguistic evidence has indisputably shown that the roots of the Romani language lie in India: the language has grammatical characteristics of Indian languages and shares with them a large part of the basic lexicon, for example, regarding body parts or daily routines.

Romani and Domari share some similarities: agglutination of postpositions of the second layer (or case marking clitics) to the nominal stem, concord markers for the past tense, the neutralisation of gender marking in the plural, and the use of the oblique case as an accusative. This has prompted much discussion about the relationships between these two languages. Domari was once thought to be a "sister language" of Romani, the two languages having split after the departure from the Indian subcontinent but later research suggests that the differences between them are significant enough to treat them as two separate languages within the Central zone (Hindustani) group of languages. The Dom and the Rom therefore likely descend from two migration waves out of India, separated by several centuries.

In phonology, the Romani language shares several isoglosses with the Central branch of Indo-Aryan languages, especially in the realization of some sounds of the Old Indo-Aryan. However, it also preserves several dental clusters. In regards to verb morphology, Romani follows exactly the same pattern of northwestern languages such as Kashmiri and Shina through the adoption of oblique enclitic pronouns as person markers, lending credence to the theory of their Central Indian origin and a subsequent migration to northwestern India. Though the retention of dental clusters suggests a break from central languages during the transition from Old to Middle Indo-Aryan, the overall morphology suggests that the language participated in some of the significant developments leading toward the emergence of New Indo-Aryan languages.

Genetic evidence 

Genetic findings in 2012 suggest the Romani originated in northwestern India and migrated as a group. According to the study, the ancestors of present scheduled castes and scheduled tribes populations of northern India, traditionally referred to collectively as the Ḍoma, are the likely ancestral populations of modern European Roma.

In December 2012, additional findings appeared to confirm the "Roma came from a single group that left northwestern India about 1,500 years ago". They reached the Balkans about 900 years ago and then spread throughout Europe. The team also found the Roma to display genetic isolation, as well as "differential gene flow in time and space with non-Romani Europeans".

Genetic research published in European Journal of Human Genetics "has revealed that over 70% of males belong to a single lineage that appears unique to the Roma".

Genetic evidence supports the medieval migration from India. The Romani have been described as "a conglomerate of genetically isolated founder populations", while a number of common Mendelian disorders among Romanies from all over Europe indicates "a common origin and founder effect". A 2020 whole-genome study confirmed the Northwest Indian origins, and also confirmed substantial Balkan and Middle Eastern ancestry.

A study from 2001 by Gresham et al. suggests "a limited number of related founders, compatible with a small group of migrants splitting from a distinct caste or tribal group". The same study found that "a single lineage... found across Romani populations, accounts for almost one-third of Romani males". A 2004 study by Morar et al. concluded that the Romani population "was founded approximately 32–40 generations ago, with secondary and tertiary founder events occurring approximately 16–25 generations ago".

Haplogroup H-M82 is a major lineage cluster in the Balkan Romani group, accounting for approximately 60% of the total. Haplogroup H is uncommon in Europe but present in the Indian subcontinent and Sri Lanka.

A study of 444 people representing three ethnic groups in North Macedonia found mtDNA haplogroups M5a1 and H7a1a were dominant in Romanies (13.7% and 10.3%, respectively).

Y-DNA composition of Muslim Romani people from Šuto Orizari Municipality in North Macedonia, based on 57 samples:
 Haplogroup H – 59.6%
 Haplogroup E – 29.8%
 Haplogroup I – 5.3%
 Haplogroup R – 3.%, of which the half are R1b and many are R1a
 Haplogroup G – 1.8%

Y-DNA Haplogroup H1a occurs in Romani at frequencies 7–70%. Unlike ethnic Hungarians, among Hungarian and Slovakian Romani subpopulations, Haplogroup E-M78 and I1 usually occur above 10% and sometimes over 20%. While among Slovakian and Tiszavasvari Romani the dominant haplogroup is H1a, among Tokaj Romani is Haplogroup J2a (23%), while among Taktaharkány Romani is Haplogroup I2a (21%). Five, rather consistent founder lineages throughout the subpopulations, were found among Romani – J-M67 and J-M92 (J2), H-M52 (H1a1), and I-P259 (I1). Haplogroup I-P259 as H is not found at frequencies of over 3 percent among host populations, while haplogroups E and I are absent in South Asia. The lineages E-V13, I-P37 (I2a) and R-M17 (R1a) may represent gene flow from the host populations. Bulgarian, Romanian and Greek Romani are dominated by Haplogroup H-M82 (H1a1), while among Spanish Romani J2 is prevalent. In Serbia among Kosovo and Belgrade Romani Haplogroup H prevails, while among Vojvodina Romani, H drops to 7 percent and E-V13 rises to a prevailing level.

Among non-Roma Europeans Haplogroup H is extremely rare, peaking at 7 percent among Albanians from Tirana and 11 percent among Bulgarian Turks. It occurs at 5 percent among Hungarians, although the carriers might be of Romani origin. Among non Roma-speaking Europeans at 2 percent among Slovaks, 2 percent among Croats, 1 percent among Macedonians from Skopje, 3 percent among Macedonian Albanians, 1 percent among Serbs from Belgrade, 3 percent among Bulgarians from Sofia, 1 percent among Austrians and Swiss, 3 percent among Romanians from Ploiești, 1 percent among Turks.

The Ottoman occupation of the Balkans also left a significant genetic mark on the Y-DNA of Romani people; creating a higher frequency of the haplogroups J and E3b in Roma populations from the region.

Full genome analysis 

A full genome autosomal DNA study on 186 Roma samples from Europe in 2019 found that modern Roma people are characterized by a common South Asian origin and a complex admixture of West Eurasian lineages, mostly a composition of Balkan, Middle East, and Caucasus-derived ancestries. The autosomal genetic data links the proto-Roma to groups in Northwest India (specifically Punjabi and Gujarati samples with low West Eurasian ancestry), as well as, Dravidian groups with high Ancient Ancestral South Indian (AASI) ancestry such as the Irula and groups in Eastern India. The  paternal lineages of Roma are most common in Southern India among Dravidian-speaking populations. The authors argue that this may point to a founder effect among early Romani people during their ethnogenesis or shortly after they migrated out of the Indian subcontinent. In addition, they also theorized of a possible low-caste origin for the Proto-Roma due to their low levels of West Eurasian ancestry.

Possible migration route 

The Romani may have emerged from what is the modern Indian state of Rajasthan, migrating to the northwest (the Punjab region of the Indian subcontinent) around 250 BCE. Their subsequent westward migration, possibly in waves, is now believed to have occurred beginning in about 500 CE.
It has also been suggested that emigration from India may have taken place in the context of the raids by Mahmud of Ghazni. As these soldiers were defeated, they were moved west with their families into the Byzantine Empire. The author Ralph Lilley Turner theorised a central Indian origin of Romani followed by a migration to Northwest India as it shares a number of ancient isoglosses with Central Indo-Aryan languages in relation to realization of some sounds of Old Indo-Aryan. This is lent further credence by its sharing exactly the same pattern of northwestern languages such as Kashmiri and Shina through the adoption of oblique enclitic pronouns as person markers. The overall morphology suggests that Romani participated in some of the significant developments leading toward the emergence of New Indo-Aryan languages, thus indicating that the proto-Romani did not leave the Indian subcontinent until late in the second half of the first millennium.

In February 2016, during the International Roma Conference, then Indian Minister of External Affairs, Sushma Swaraj stated that the people of the Roma community were children of India. The conference ended with a recommendation to the government of India to recognize the Roma community spread across 30 countries as a part of the Indian diaspora.

Names

Endonyms 
Rom means husband in the Romani language. It has the variants dom and lom, which may be related to the Sanskrit words dam-pati (lord of the house, husband), dama (to subdue), lom (hair), lomaka (hairy), loman, roman (hairy), romaça (man with beard and long hair). Another possible origin is from Sanskrit डोम doma (member of a low caste of travelling musicians and dancers). Despite their presence in the country and neighboring nations, the word is not related in any way to the name of Romania.

Romani usage 
In the Romani language, Rom is a masculine noun, meaning 'husband of the Roma ethnic group', with the plural Roma. The feminine of Rom in the Romani language is Romni /Romli/Romnije or Romlije. However, in most cases, in other languages Rom is now used for individuals regardless of gender.

Romani is the feminine adjective, while Romano is the masculine adjective. Some Romanies use Rom or Roma as an ethnic name, while others (such as the Sinti, or the Romanichal) do not use this term as a self-ascription for the entire ethnic group.

Sometimes, rom and romani are spelled with a double r, i.e., rrom and rromani. In this case rr is used to represent the phoneme  (also written as ř and rh), which in some Romani dialects has remained different from the one written with a single r. The rr spelling is common in certain institutions (such as the INALCO Institute in Paris), or used in certain countries, e.g., Romania, to distinguish from the endonym/homonym for Romanians (sg. român, pl. români).

In Norway, Romani is used exclusively for an older Northern Romani-speaking population (which arrived in the 16th century) while Rom/Romanes is used to describe Vlax Romani-speaking groups which have arrived since the 19th century.

English usage 
 
In the English language (according to the Oxford English Dictionary), Rom is a noun (with the plural Roma or Roms) and an adjective, while Romani (Romany) is also a noun (with the plural Romani, the Romani, Romanies, or Romanis) and an adjective. Both Rom and Romani have been in use in English since the 19th century as an alternative for Gypsy. Romani was sometimes spelled Rommany, but more often Romany, while today Romani is the most popular spelling. Occasionally, the double r spelling (e.g., Rroma, Rromani) mentioned above is also encountered in English texts.

The term Roma is increasingly encountered as a generic term for the Romani people.

Because not all Romani people use the word Romani as an adjective, the term became a noun for the entire ethnic group. Today, the term Romani is used by some organizations, including the United Nations and the US Library of Congress. However, the Council of Europe and other organizations consider that Roma is the correct term referring to all related groups, regardless of their country of origin, and recommend that Romani be restricted to the language and culture: Romani language, Romani culture. The United Kingdom government uses the term "Roma" as a sub-group of "White" in its ethnic classification system.

The standard assumption is that the demonyms of the Romani people, Lom and Dom, share the same origin.

Other designations 

The English term Gypsy (or Gipsy) originates from the Middle English gypcian, short for Egipcien. The Spanish term Gitano and French Gitan have similar etymologies. They are ultimately derived from the Greek  (Aigyptioi), meaning Egyptian, via Latin. This designation owes its existence to the belief, common in the Middle Ages, that the Romani, or some related group (such as the Middle Eastern Dom people), were itinerant Egyptians. This belief appears to be derived from verses in the Biblical Book of Ezekiel (29: 6 and 12–13) which refer to the Egyptians being scattered among the nations by an angry God. According to one narrative, they were exiled from Egypt as punishment for allegedly harbouring the infant Jesus. In his book The Zincali: an account of the Gypsies of Spain, George Borrow notes that when they first appeared in Germany, it was under the character of Egyptians doing penance for their having refused hospitality to Mary and her son. As described in Victor Hugo's novel The Hunchback of Notre-Dame, the medieval French referred to the Romanies as Egyptiens.

This exonym is sometimes written with capital letter, to show that it designates an ethnic group. However, the word is sometimes considered derogatory because of its negative and stereotypical associations. The Council of Europe consider that "Gypsy" or equivalent terms, as well as administrative terms such as "Gens du Voyage" are not in line with European recommendations. In Britain, many Romani proudly identify as "Gypsies". In North America, the word Gypsy is most commonly used as a reference to Romani ethnicity, though lifestyle and fashion are at times also referenced by using this word.

Another common designation of the Romani people, which can be considered derogatory, is Cingane (alt. Çingene, Tsinganoi, Zigar, Zigeuner, Tschingaren), likely deriving from the Persian word , derived from the Turkic word , meaning poor person. It is also possible that the origin of this word is Athinganoi, the name of a Christian sect with whom the Romani (or some related group) could have become associated with in the past.

History

Arrival in Europe 
According to a 2012 genomic study, the Romani reached the Balkans as early as the 12th century. A document of 1068, describing an event in Constantinople, mentions "Atsingani", probably referring to Romani.

Later historical records of the Romani reaching south-eastern Europe are from the 14th century: in 1322, after leaving Ireland on a pilgrimage to Jerusalem, Irish Franciscan friar Symon Semeonis encountered a migrant group of Romani outside the town of Candia (modern Heraklion), in Crete, calling them "the descendants of Cain"; his account is the earliest surviving description by a Western chronicler of the Romani in Europe.

In 1350, Ludolph of Saxony mentioned a similar people with a unique language whom he called Mandapolos, a word possibly derived from the Greek word mantes (meaning prophet or fortune teller).

In the 14th century, Romani are recorded in Venetian territories, including Methoni and Nafplio in the Peloponnese, and Corfu. Around 1360, a fiefdom called the Feudum Acinganorum was established in Corfu, which mainly used Romani serfs and to which the Romani on the island were subservient.

By the 1440s, they were recorded in Germany; and by the 16th century, Scotland and Sweden. Some Romani migrated from Persia through North Africa, reaching the Iberian Peninsula in the 15th century. The two currents met in France.

Around the year 1000, an event in northern India, about the time of Muslim invaders, likely triggered the Roma’s mass exodus. The precise event is still unknown, but the possible reasons include a conflict that resulted in their persecution, a natural disaster, or even recruitment into a mercenary military. The Roma people journeyed towards the Caucasus and China, as well as through the Middle East and Greece towards the Balkans; they covered all corners of today's Central and Western Europe by the end of the 16th century. Romanis typically traveled in patriarchal extended families, consisting of up to hundreds of people.

Early modern history 

Their early history shows a mixed reception. Although 1385 marks the first recorded transaction for a Romani slave in Wallachia, they were issued safe conduct by Holy Roman Emperor Sigismund in 1417. Romanis were ordered expelled from the Meissen region of Germany in 1416, Lucerne in 1471, Milan in 1493, France in 1504, Catalonia in 1512, Sweden in 1525, England in 1530 (see Egyptians Act 1530), and Denmark in 1536. From 1510 onwards, any Romani found in Switzerland were to be executed; while in England (beginning in 1554) and Denmark (beginning of 1589) any Romani which did not leave within a month were to be executed. Portugal began deportations of Romanis to its colonies in 1538.

A 1596 English statute gave Romanis special privileges that other wanderers lacked. France passed a similar law in 1683. Catherine the Great of Russia declared the Romanis "crown slaves" (a status superior to serfs), but also kept them out of certain parts of the capital. In 1595, Ștefan Răzvan overcame his birth into slavery, and became the Voivode (Prince) of Moldavia.

Since a royal edict by Charles II in 1695, Spanish Romanis had been restricted to certain towns. An official edict in 1717 restricted them to only 75 towns and districts, so that they would not be concentrated in any one region. In the Great Gypsy Round-up, Romani were arrested and imprisoned by the Spanish Monarchy in 1749.

During the latter part of the 17th century, around the Franco-Dutch War, both France and the Dutch Republic needed thousands of men to fight. Some recruitment took the form of rounding up vagrants and the poor to work the galleys and provide the armies' labour force. With this background, Romanis were targets of both the French and the Dutch.

After the wars, and into the first decade of the 18th century, Romanis were slaughtered with impunity throughout Holland. Romanis, called ‘heiden’ by the Dutch, wandered throughout the rural areas of Europe and became the societal pariahs of the age. Heidenjachten, translated as "heathen hunt" happened throughout Holland in an attempt to eradicate them.

Although some Romani could be kept as slaves in Wallachia and Moldavia until abolition in 1856, the majority traveled as free nomads with their wagons, as alluded to in the spoked wheel symbol in the Romani flag. Elsewhere in Europe, they were subjected to ethnic cleansing, abduction of their children, and forced labour. In England, Romani were sometimes expelled from small communities or hanged; in France, they were branded, and their heads were shaved; in Moravia and Bohemia, the women were marked by their ears being severed. As a result, large groups of the Romani moved to the East, toward Poland, which was more tolerant, and Russia, where the Romani were treated more fairly as long as they paid the annual taxes.

Modern history 
Romani began emigrating to North America in colonial times, with small groups recorded in Virginia and French Louisiana. Larger-scale Roma emigration to the United States began in the 1860s, with Romanichal groups from Great Britain. The most significant number immigrated in the early 20th century, mainly from the Vlax group of Kalderash. Many Romani also settled in South America.

World War II 

During World War II and the Holocaust, the Nazis committed a systematic genocide against the Romani people. In the Romani language, this genocide is known as the Porajmos. Romanies were marked for extermination and sentenced to forced labor and imprisonment in concentration camps. They were often killed on sight, especially by the Einsatzgruppen (paramilitary death squads) on the Eastern Front. The total number of victims has been variously estimated at between 220,000 and 1,500,000.

The Romani people were also persecuted in Nazi puppet states. In the Independent State of Croatia, the Ustaša killed almost the entire Roma population of 25,000. The concentration camp system of Jasenovac, run by the Ustaša militia and the Croat political police, were responsible for the deaths of between 15,000 and 20,000 Roma.

Post-1945 
In Czechoslovakia, they were labeled a "socially degraded stratum", and Romani women were sterilized as part of a state policy to reduce their population. This policy was implemented with large financial incentives, threats of denying future welfare payments, with misinformation, or after administering drugs.

An official inquiry from the Czech Republic, resulting in a report (December 2005), concluded that the Communist authorities had practised an assimilation policy towards Romanis, which "included efforts by social services to control the birth rate in the Romani community. The problem of sexual sterilisation carried out in the Czech Republic, either with improper motivation or illegally, exists," said the Czech Public Defender of Rights, recommending state compensation for women affected between 1973 and 1991. New cases were revealed up until 2004, in both the Czech Republic and Slovakia. Germany, Norway, Sweden and Switzerland "all have histories of coercive sterilization of minorities and other groups".

Society and traditional culture 

The traditional Romanies place a high value on the extended family. Virginity is essential in unmarried women. Both men and women often marry young; there has been controversy in several countries over the Romani practice of child marriage. Romani law establishes that the man's family must pay a bride price to the bride's parents, but only traditional families still follow it.

Once married, the woman joins the husband's family, where her main job is to tend to her husband's and her children's needs and take care of her in-laws. The power structure in the traditional Romani household has at its top the oldest man or grandfather, and men, in general, have more authority than women. Women gain respect and power as they get older. Young wives begin gaining authority once they have children.

Traditionally, as can be seen on paintings and photos, some Roma men wear shoulder-length hair and a mustache, as well as an earring.
Roma women generally have long hair, and Xoraxane Roma women often dye it blonde with henna.

Romani social behavior is strictly regulated by Indian social customs ("marime" or "marhime"), still respected by most Roma (and by most older generations of Sinti). This regulation affects many aspects of life and is applied to actions, people and things: parts of the human body are considered impure: the genital organs (because they produce emissions) and the rest of the lower body. Clothes for the lower body, as well as the clothes of menstruating women, are washed separately. Items used for eating are also washed in a different place. Childbirth is considered impure and must occur outside the dwelling place. The mother is deemed to be impure for forty days after giving birth.

Death is considered impure, and affects the whole family of the dead, who remain impure for a period of time. In contrast to the practice of cremating the dead, Romani dead must be buried. Cremation and burial are both known from the time of the Rigveda, and both are widely practiced in Hinduism today (the general tendency is for Hindus to practice cremation, though some communities in modern-day South India tend to bury their dead). Animals that are considered to be having unclean habits are not eaten by the community.

Belonging and exclusion 

In Romani philosophy, Romanipen (also romanypen, romanipe, romanype, romanimos, romaimos, romaniya) is the totality of the Romani spirit, Romani culture, Romani Law, being a Romani, a set of Romani strains.

An ethnic Romani is considered a gadjo in the Romani society if they have no Romanipen. Sometimes a non-Romani may be considered a Romani if they do have Romanipen. Usually this is an adopted child. It has been hypothesized that this owes more to a framework of culture than a simple adherence to historically received rules.

Religion 

Most Romani people are Christian, others Muslim; some retained their ancient faith of Hinduism from their original homeland of India, while others have their own religion and political organization. Theravada Buddhism influenced by the Dalit Buddhist movement have become popular in recent times among Hungarian Roma.

Some Roma practice witchcraft and palmistry.

Beliefs 
The modern-day Romani people adopted Christianity or Islam depending on the regions through which they had migrated. Muslim Roma are found in Turkey, Bosnia and Herzegovina, Albania, Egypt, Kosovo, North Macedonia, Serbia, Bulgaria and Iran, forming a very significant proportion of the Romani people. In neighboring countries such as Romania and Greece, most Romani inhabitants follow the practice of Orthodoxy. It is likely that the adherence to differing religions prevented families from engaging in intermarriage.

Deities and saints 
Blessed Ceferino Giménez Malla is recently considered a patron saint of the Romani people in Roman Catholicism. Saint Sarah, or Sara e Kali, has also been venerated as a patron saint in her shrine at Saintes-Maries-de-la-Mer, France. Since the turn of the 21st century, Sara e Kali is understood to have been Kali, an Indian deity brought from India by the refugee ancestors of the Roma people; as the Roma became Christianized, she was absorbed in a syncretic way and venerated as a saint.

Saint Sarah is now increasingly being considered as "a Romani Goddess, the Protectress of the Roma" and an "indisputable link with Mother India".

Balkans 

For the Roma communities that have resided in the Balkans for numerous centuries, often referred to as "Turkish Gypsies", the following histories apply for religious beliefs:
 Bosnia and Herzegovina and Montenegro – Islam is the dominant religion among the Roma.
 Bulgaria – In northwestern Bulgaria, in addition to Sofia and Kyustendil, Christianity is the dominant faith among Romani people (a major conversion to Eastern Orthodox Christianity among Romani people has occurred). In southeastern Bulgaria, Islam is the dominant religion among Romani people, with a smaller section of the Romani population declaring themselves as "Turks", continuing to mix ethnicity with Islam.

 Croatia – After the Second World War a large number of Muslim Roma relocated to Croatia (the majority moving from Kosovo). Their language differs from those living in Međimurje and those who survived Ustaše genocide.
 Greece – The descendants of groups, such as Sepečides or Sevljara, Kalpazaja, Filipidži and others, living in Athens, Thessaloniki, central Greece and Greek Macedonia are mostly Orthodox Christians, with Islamic beliefs held by a minority of the population. Following the Peace Treaty of Lausanne of 1923, many Muslim Roma moved to Turkey in the subsequent population exchange between Turkey and Greece.

 Kosovo – The vast majority of the Roma population in Kosovo is Muslim.
 North Macedonia – The majority of Roma people are followers of Islam.
 Romania – According to the 2002 census, the majority of the Romani minority living in Romania are Orthodox Christians, while 6.4% are Pentecostals, 3.8% Roman Catholics, 3% Reformed, 1.1% Greek Catholics, 0.9% Baptists, 0.8% Seventh-Day Adventists. In Dobruja, there is a small community that are Muslim and also speak Turkish.
 Serbia – Most Roma people in Serbia are Orthodox Christian, but there are some Muslim Roma in Southern Serbia, who are mainly refugees from Kosovo.

Other regions 

In Ukraine and Russia, the Roma populations are also Muslim as the families of Balkan migrants continue to live in these locations. Their ancestors settled on the Crimean peninsula during the 17th and 18th centuries, but some migrated to Ukraine, southern Russia and the Povolzhie (along the Volga River). Formally, Islam is the religion that these communities align themselves with and the people are recognized for their staunch preservation of the Romani language and identity.

In Poland and Slovakia, their populations are Roman Catholic, many times adopting and following local, cultural Catholicism as a syncretic system of belief that incorporates distinct Roma beliefs and cultural aspects. For example, many Polish Roma delay their Church wedding due to the belief that sacramental marriage is accompanied by divine ratification, creating a virtually indissoluble union until the couple consummate, after which the sacramental marriage is dissoluble only by the death of a spouse. Therefore, for Polish Roma, once married, one can't ever divorce. Another aspect of Polish Roma's Catholicism is a tradition of pilgrimage to the Jasna Góra Monastery.

Most Eastern European Romanies are Roman Catholic, Eastern Orthodox, or Muslim. Those in Western Europe and the United States are mostly Roman Catholic or Protestant in southern Spain, many Romanies are Pentecostal, but this is a small minority that has emerged in contemporary times. In Egypt, the Romanies are split into Christian and Muslim populations.

Music 
          

Romani music plays an important role in Central and Eastern European countries such as Croatia, Bosnia and Herzegovina, Serbia, Montenegro, Bulgaria, North Macedonia, Albania, Hungary, Slovakia, Slovenia and Romania, and the style and performance practices of Romani musicians have influenced European classical composers such as Franz Liszt and Johannes Brahms. The lăutari who perform at traditional Romanian weddings are virtually all Romani.

Probably the most internationally prominent contemporary performers in the lăutari tradition are Taraful Haiducilor. Bulgaria's popular "wedding music", too, is almost exclusively performed by Romani musicians such as Ivo Papasov, a virtuoso clarinetist closely associated with this genre and Bulgarian pop-folk singer Azis.

Many famous classical musicians, such as the Hungarian pianist Georges Cziffra, are Romani, as are many prominent performers of manele. Zdob și Zdub, one of the most prominent rock bands in Moldova, although not Romanies themselves, draw heavily on Romani music, as do Spitalul de Urgență in Romania, Shantel in Germany, Goran Bregović in Serbia, Darko Rundek in Croatia, Beirut and Gogol Bordello in the United States.

Another tradition of Romani music is the genre of the Romani brass band, with such notable practitioners as Boban Marković of Serbia, and the brass lăutari groups Fanfare Ciocărlia and Fanfare din Cozmesti of Romania.

The distinctive sound of Romani music has also strongly influenced bolero, jazz, and flamenco (especially cante jondo) in Spain.

Dances such as the flamenco and bolero of Spain were influenced by the Romani. Antonio Cansino blended Romani and Spanish flamenco and is credited with creating modern-day Spanish dance. The Dancing Cansinos popularized flamenco and bolero dancing in the United States. Famous dancer and actress, Rita Hayworth, is the granddaughter of Antonio Cansino.

European-style gypsy jazz ("jazz Manouche" or "Sinti jazz") is still widely practiced among the original creators (the Romanie People); one who acknowledged this artistic debt was guitarist Django Reinhardt. Contemporary artists in this tradition known internationally include Stochelo Rosenberg, Biréli Lagrène, Jimmy Rosenberg, Paulus Schäfer and Tchavolo Schmitt.

The Romani people in Turkey have achieved musical acclaim from national and local audiences. Local performers usually perform for special holidays. Their music is usually performed on instruments such as the darbuka, gırnata and cümbüş.

Folklore

Romani folktales and legends are known as paramichia. A hero among the Vlach Roma is Mundro Salamon or Wise Solomon. Other Romani groups call this hero O Godjiaver Yanko.

The Roma believe in the mulo or mullo, which means one who is dead. These beings are the Roma's version of the vampire.

Cuisine

The Roma believe that some foods are auspicious, or lucky (baxtalo), such as foods with pungent tastes like garlic, lemon, tomato, peppers, and fermented foods such as sauerkraut, pickles and sour cream. Hedgehogs are a delicacy among some Roma.

Contemporary art and culture 
Romani contemporary art emerged at the climax of the process that began in Central and Eastern Europe in the late 1980s, when the interpretation of the cultural practice of minorities was enabled by a paradigm shift, commonly referred to in specialist literature as the Cultural turn. The idea of the "cultural turn" was introduced; and this was also the time when the notion of cultural democracy became crystallized in the debates carried on at various public forums. Civil society gained strength, and civil politics appeared, which is a prerequisite for cultural democracy. This shift of attitude in scholarly circles derived from concerns specific not only to ethnicity but also to society, gender and class.

Language 

Most Romani speak one of several dialects of the Romani language, an Indo-Aryan language, with roots in Sanskrit. They also often speak the languages of the countries they live in. Typically, they also incorporate loanwords and calques into Romani from the languages of those countries and especially words for terms that the Romani language does not have. Most of the Ciganos of Portugal, the Gitanos of Spain, the Romanichal of the UK, and Scandinavian Travellers have lost their knowledge of pure Romani, and speak the mixed languages Caló, Angloromany, and Scandoromani, respectively. Most of the Romani language-speaking communities in these regions consist of later immigrants from eastern or central Europe.

There are no concrete statistics for the number of Romani speakers, both in Europe and globally. However, a conservative estimate is 3.5 million speakers in Europe and a further 500,000 elsewhere, though the actual number may be considerably higher. This makes Romani the second-largest minority language in Europe, behind Catalan.

In regards to the diversity of dialects, Romani works in the same way as most other European languages. Cross-dialect communication is dominated by the following features:
 All Romani speakers are bilingual, accustomed to borrowing words or phrases from a second language; this makes it difficult to communicate with Romanis from different countries
 Romani was traditionally a language shared between extended family and a close-knit community. This has resulted in the inability to comprehend dialects from other countries, and is why Romani is sometimes considered to be several different languages.
 There is no tradition or literary standard for Romani speakers to use as a guideline for their language use.

Persecutions

Historical persecution 
One of the most enduring persecutions against the Romani people was their enslavement. Slavery was widely practiced in medieval Europe, including the territory of present-day Romania from before the founding of the principalities of Moldavia and Wallachia in the 13th–14th centuries. Legislation decreed that all the Romani living in these states, as well as any others who immigrated there, were classified as slaves. Slavery was gradually abolished during the 1840s and 1850s.

The exact origins of slavery in the Danubian Principalities are not known. There is some debate over whether the Romani people came to Wallachia and Moldavia as free men or were brought there as slaves. Historian Nicolae Iorga associated the Roma people's arrival with the 1241 Mongol invasion of Europe and he also considered their enslavement a vestige of that era, in which the Romanians took the Roma from the Mongols and preserved their status as slaves so they could use their labor. Other historians believe that the Romani were enslaved while they were being captured during the battles with the Tatars. The practice of enslaving prisoners of war may have also been adopted from the Mongols.

Some Romani may have been slaves of the Mongols or the Tatars or they may have served as auxiliary troops in the Mongol or Tatar armies, but most of them migrated from south of the Danube at the end of the 14th century, some time after the founding of Wallachia. By then, the institution of slavery was already established in Moldavia and it was possibly established in both principalities. After the Roma migrated into the area, slavery became a widespread practice among the majority of the population. The Tatar slaves, smaller in numbers, were eventually merged into the Roma population.

Some branches of the Romani people reached Western Europe in the 15th century, fleeing from the Ottoman conquest of the Balkans as refugees. Although the Romani were refugees from the conflicts in southeastern Europe, they were often suspected of being associated with the Ottoman invasion by certain populations in the West because their physical appearance was exotic. (The Imperial Diet at Landau and Freiburg in 1496–1498 declared that the Romani were spies for the Turks). In Western Europe, such suspicions and discrimination against people who constituted a visible minority resulted in persecution, often violent, with attempts to commit ethnic cleansing until the modern era. In times of social tension, the Romani suffered as scapegoats; for instance, they were accused of bringing the plague during times of epidemics.

On 30 July 1749, Spain conducted The Great Roundup of Romani (Gitanos) in its territory. The Spanish Crown ordered a nationwide raid that led to the break-up of families because all able-bodied men were interned in forced labor camps in an attempt to commit ethnic cleansing. The measure was eventually reversed and the Romanis were freed as protests began to erupt in different communities, sedentary Romanis were highly esteemed and protected in rural Spain.

Later in the 19th century, Romani immigration was forbidden on a racial basis in areas outside Europe, mostly in the English-speaking world. In 1880, Argentina prohibited immigration by Roma, as did the United States in 1885.

Forced assimilation 
In the Habsburg monarchy under Maria Theresa (1740–1780), a series of decrees tried to integrate the Romanies in order to get them to permanently settle, removed their rights to horse and wagon ownership (1754) in order to reduce citizen-mobility, renamed them "New Citizens" and obliged Romani boys into military service just as any other citizens were if they had no trade (1761, and Revision 1770), required them to register with the local authorities (1767), and another decree prohibited marriages between Romanies (1773) in order to integrate them into the local population. Her successor Josef II prohibited the wearing of traditional Romani clothing along with the use of the Romani language, both of which were punishable by flogging. During this time, the schools were obliged to register and integrate Romani children; this policy was the first of the modern policies of integration. In Spain, attempts to assimilate the Gitanos were under way as early as 1619, when the Gitanos were forcibly settled, the use of the Romani language was prohibited, Gitano men and women were sent to separate workhouses and their children were sent to orphanages. King Charles III took a more progressive approach to Gitano assimilation, proclaiming that they had the same rights as Spanish citizens and ending the official denigration of them which was based on their race. While he prohibited their nomadic lifestyle, their use of the Calo language, the manufacture and wearing of Romani clothing, their trade in horses and other itinerant trades, he also forbade any form of discrimination against them and he also forbade the guilds from barring them. The use of the word gitano was also forbidden in order to further their assimilation, it was replaced with "New Castilian", a designation which was also applied to former Jews and Muslims.

Most historians believe that Charles III's pragmática failed for three main reasons, reasons which were ultimately derived from its implementation outside major cities as well as in marginal areas: The difficulty which the Gitano community faced in changing its nomadic lifestyle, the marginal lifestyle to which the community had been driven by society and the serious difficulties of applying the pragmática in the fields of education and work. One author ascribes its failure to the overall rejection of the integration of the Gitanos by the wider population.

Other policies of forced assimilation were implemented in other countries, one of these countries was Norway, where a law which permitted the state to remove children from their parents and place them in state institutions was passed in 1896. This resulted in some 1,500 Romani children being taken from their parents in the 20th century.

Porajmos (Romani Holocaust) 

During World War II and The Holocaust, the persecution of the Romanies reached a peak during the Romani Holocaust (the Porajmos), the genocide which was perpetrated against them by Nazi Germany. In 1935, the Romani people who lived in Nazi Germany lost their citizenship when it was stripped from them by the Nuremberg laws, after that, they were subjected to violence and imprisonment in concentration camps and later, they were subjected to genocide in extermination camps. During the war, the policy was extended to areas which were occupied by the Nazis, and it was also implemented by their allies, most notably, by the Independent State of Croatia, Romania, and Hungary.

Because no accurate pre-war census figures exist for the Romanis, the actual number of Romani victims who were killed in the Romani Holocaust cannot be assessed. Most estimates of the number of Romani victims who were killed in the Romani Holocaust range from 200,000 to 500,000, but other estimates range from 90,000 to 1.5 million. Lower estimates do not include those Romanis who were killed in all Axis-controlled countries. A detailed study by Sybil Milton, a former senior historian at the U.S. Holocaust Memorial Museum contained an estimate of at least 220,000, possibly as many as 500,000. Ian Hancock, Director of the Program of Romani Studies and the Romani Archives and Documentation Center at the University of Texas at Austin, argues in favour of a higher figure of between 500,000 and 1,500,000.

In Central Europe, the extermination in the Protectorate of Bohemia and Moravia was so thorough that the Bohemian Romani language became extinct.

Contemporary issues 

In Europe, Romani people are associated with poverty, blamed for high crime rates, and accused of behaving in ways that are considered antisocial or inappropriate by the rest of the European population. Partly for this reason, discrimination against the Romani people has continued to be practiced to the present day, although efforts are being made to address them.

Amnesty International reports continued to document instances of Antizigan discrimination during the late 20th century, particularly in Romania, Serbia, Slovakia, Hungary, Slovenia, and Kosovo. The European Union has recognized that discrimination against Romani must be addressed, and with the national Roma integration strategy they encourage member states to work towards greater Romani inclusion and upholding the rights of the Romani in the European Union.

In Eastern Europe, Roma children often attend Roma Special Schools, separate from non-Roma children; these schools tend to offer a lower quality of education than the traditional education options accessible by non-Roma children, putting the Roma children at an educational disadvantage.

The Romanis of Kosovo have been severely persecuted by ethnic Albanians since the end of the Kosovo War, and for the most part, the region's Romani community has been annihilated.

Czechoslovakia carried out a policy of sterilization of Romani women, starting in 1973. The dissidents of the Charter 77 denounced it in 1977–78 as a genocide, but the practice continued through the Velvet Revolution of 1989. A 2005 report by the Czech Republic's independent ombudsman, Otakar Motejl, identified dozens of cases of coercive sterilization between 1979 and 2001, and called for criminal investigations and possible prosecution against several health care workers and administrators.

In 2008, following the rape and subsequent murder of an Italian woman in Rome at the hands of a young man from a local Romani encampment, the Italian government declared that Italy's Romani population represented a national security risk and it also declared that it was required to take swift action in order to address the emergenza nomadi (nomad emergency). Specifically, officials in the Italian government accused the Romanies of being responsible for rising crime rates in urban areas.

The 2008 deaths of Cristina and Violetta Djeordsevic, two Roma children who drowned while Italian beach-goers remained unperturbed, brought international attention to the relationship between Italians and the Roma people. Reviewing the situation in 2012, one Belgian magazine observed:

The 2016 Pew Research poll found that Italians, in particular, hold strong anti-Roma views, with 82% of Italians expressing negative opinions about Roma. In Greece, 67%, in Hungary 64%, in France 61%, in Spain 49%, in Poland 47%, in the UK 45%, in Sweden 42%, in Germany 40%, and in the Netherlands 37% had an unfavourable view of Roma. The 2019 Pew Research poll found that 83% of Italians, 76% of Slovaks, 72% of Greeks, 68% of Bulgarians, 66% of Czechs, 61% of Lithuanians, 61% of Hungarians, 54% of Ukrainians, 52% of Russians, 51% of Poles, 44% of French, 40% of Spaniards, and 37% of Germans held unfavorable views of Roma. IRES published in 2020 a survey which revealed that 72% of Romanians have a negative opinion about them.

As of 2019, reports of anti-Roma incidents are increasing across Europe. Discrimination against Roma remains widespread in Kosovo, Romania, Slovakia, Bulgaria, and the Czech Republic. Roma communities across Ukraine have been the target of violent attacks.

Roma refugees fleeing the 2022 Russian invasion of Ukraine have faced discrimination in Europe, including in Poland, the Czech Republic, and Moldova

Concerning employment, on average, across the European states which were surveyed, 16% of Roma women were in paid work in 2016 compared to a third of men.

Forced repatriation 

In the summer of 2010, French authorities demolished at least 51 Roma camps and began the process of repatriating their residents to their countries of origin. This followed tensions between the French state and Roma communities, which had been heightened after a traveller drove through a French police checkpoint, hit an officer, attempted to hit two more officers, and was then shot and killed by the police. In retaliation a group of Roma, armed with hatchets and iron bars, attacked the police station of Saint-Aignan, toppled traffic lights and road signs and burned three cars. The French government has been accused of perpetrating these actions to pursue its political agenda. EU Justice Commissioner Viviane Reding stated that the European Commission should take legal action against France over the issue, calling the deportations "a disgrace". A leaked file dated 5 August, sent from the Interior Ministry to regional police chiefs, included the instruction: "Three hundred camps or illegal settlements must be cleared within three months, Roma camps are a priority."

Organizations and projects 
 World Romani Congress
 European Roma Rights Centre
 Gypsy Lore Society
 International Romani Union
 Decade of Roma Inclusion, multinational project
 International Romani Day (8 April)
 Contact Point for Roma and Sinti Issues
 National Advisory Board on Romani Affairs (Finland)

Artistic representations 

Many depictions of Romani people in literature and art present romanticized narratives of the mystical powers of fortune telling or they portray Romani people as people who have an irascible or passionate temper which is paired with an indomitable love of freedom and a habit of criminality. Romani were a popular subject in Venetian painting from the time of Giorgione at the start of the 16th century; the inclusion of such a figure adds an exotic oriental flavour to scenes. A Venetian Renaissance painting by Paris Bordone (c. 1530, Strasbourg) of the Holy Family in Egypt makes Elizabeth a Romani fortune-teller; the scene is otherwise located in a distinctly European landscape.

Particularly notable are classics like the story Carmen by Prosper Mérimée and the opera based on it by Georges Bizet, Victor Hugo's The Hunchback of Notre Dame, Herge's The Castafiore Emerald, Miguel de Cervantes' La Gitanilla and George Borrow's Lavengro and The Romany Rye. The Romani were also depicted in A Midsummer Night's Dream, As You Like It, Othello and The Tempest, all by William Shakespeare.

The Romani were also heavily romanticized in the Soviet Union, a classic example being the 1975 film Tabor ukhodit v Nebo.
A more realistic depiction of contemporary Romani in the Balkans, featuring Romani lay actors speaking in their native dialects, although still playing with established clichés of a Romani penchant for both magic and crime, was presented by Emir Kusturica in his Time of the Gypsies (1988) and Black Cat, White Cat (1998). The films of Tony Gatlif, a French director of Romani ethnicity, like Les Princes (1983), Latcho Drom (1993) and Gadjo Dilo (1997) also portray Romani life.

See also 
 Anti-Hindu sentiment
 Anti-Indian sentiment
 Racism in Europe
 Environmental racism in Europe
 Gitanos
 Gypsy Scourge
 History of the Romani people
 King of the Gypsies
 R v Krymowski
 Rajasthani people
 Romani society and culture
 Romani dress
 Romani diaspora
 Ethnic groups in Europe
 Romani folklore

General
 Traveler (disambiguation)
 Itinerant groups in Europe
 Nomadic tribes in India
 Dalit

Lists
 List of Romani people
 List of Romani settlements

Other
 Indian people
 Non-resident Indian and person of Indian origin

Notes 

Kosovo status

References

Sources

Further reading 
 
 
 
 
 
 
 
 
 
 
 .
 
 
 Sancar Seckiner's comprehensible book South (Güney),  2013, consists of 12 article and essays. One of them, Ikiçeşmelik, highlights Turkish Romani People's life. Ref. .
 Sancar Seckiner' s new book Thilda's House (Thilda'nın Evi), 2017, underlines struggle of Istanbul Romani People who have been swept away from nearby Kadikoy. Ref. .

External links 

European countries Roma links
 .
 .
 .
 . History of some Roma Europeans
 
 The concentration, labor, ghetto camps that the Roma were persecuted in during World War II
 .
 .
 .
 .
 .
 Shot in remote areas of the Thar desert in Northwest India,  captures the lives of vanishing nomadic communities who are believed to share common ancestors with the Roma people released 2004

Non-governmental organisations
 .
 . Beginning in 1888, the Gypsy Lore Society started to publish a journal that was meant to dispel rumors about their lifestyle.

Museums and libraries
 .
 .
 .
 .
  The most comprehensive collection of information on Kosovo's Roma in existence.

 
 
Ethnic groups in Europe
Indo-Aryan peoples
Nomadic groups in Eurasia
Ethnic groups in the Middle East
Ethnic groups in South Asia
Ethnic groups in North Africa
Stateless nationalism
Ethnic groups in South America